Gurab Varzal (also Romanized as Gūrāb Varzal) is a village in Lakan Rural District, in the Central District of Rasht County, Gilan Province, Iran. At the 2006 census, its population was 499, in 129 families.

References 

Populated places in Rasht County